The Yallourn 900 mm railway was a  narrow gauge railway operated by the State Electricity Commission of Victoria in the Latrobe Valley of Victoria, Australia. The railway was built for the haulage of brown coal and overburden between the Yallourn open cut mine, briquette works, and power station. The Morwell Interconnecting Railway (ICR) was later constructed, linking the Yallourn mine complex with the Hazelwood open cut, briquette works, and power station.

Operation

The network used overhead-wire electrification, and track in the open-cut mine was frequently moved using special track shifters. Locomotives were supplied by Henschel & Son, Siemens, and Hitachi. Use of the electric locomotive declined in later years, with diesel locomotives used on the Interconnecting Railway in the 1990s.

The Yallourn railway commenced operation with the power station, being replaced by conveyor belts in 1984. The Morwell Interconnecting Railway opened with the Hazelwood complex, and crossed the main Gippsland railway by an overpass to the West of Morwell. The ICR was replaced by diesel locomotive haulage in 1993, with railway operations ending in October 2000 and the track was lifted between September and December 2001. A number of wagons from the railway after closure were acquired by the Walhalla Goldfields Railway and regauged for their use. A locomotive and coal wagon from the line are preserved at the North Williamstown railway museum.

Gallery

See also
 Yallourn railway line

References

Further reading

External links
Railpage Australia: Former Inter-connecting railway (SECV) Morwell
Ausloco mailing list: ICR (interconnecting railway)
Darren's Gunzel Gallery: SEC Railway photos
Locomotive and rolling stock plans

Railway lines in Victoria (Australia)
900 mm gauge railways in Australia
Transport in Gippsland (region)
City of Latrobe